Aleksey Ivanovich Vakhonin (10 March 1935 – 1 September 1993) was a former Russian weightlifter and Olympic champion who competed for the Soviet Union. He won a gold medal at the 1964 Summer Olympics in Tokyo.

Biography
Vakhonin was born in the village Gavrilovka of Kemerovo Oblast. As his father died in World War II, the family lived very poorly, and Aleksei had to leave school and start working as miner. Eventually, he fell into bad company and got addicted to alcohol and smoking. Luckily, he was noticed by the renowned weightlifter Rudolf Plyukfelder, who noticed talents in Vakhonin and invited him to move to Kiselevsk for training and working at a mine there. It took Plyukfelder several years of hard work to convert a hooligan into a sportsman. In 1961 Vakhonin became the national champion winning over five-time world champion Vladimir Stogov. In 1963 he became world champion in the bantamweight with a total of 345 kg.

The peak of sporting career came for Vakhonin at the 1964 Olympic Games in Tokyo where he had a dramatic competition with Imre Foldi. After snatch and clean and press Foldi had a lead of 2.5 kg, and after setting a new world record in clean and jerk (135 kg) was already congratulated as the winner. In response, Vakhonin lifted 137.5 kg, but Foldi did the same. Vakhonin had to lift 142.5 kg to win, which he did. While standing with the weight above his head, he lifted one leg in a stork-like manner to show that the celebrations were premature and he could do more if needed.

After a failure at the World Championships in Tehran (1965) Vakhonin rebounded by winning in 1966 in Berlin, defeating Foldi once again. In total he won three world (1963, 1964 and 1966) and three European (1963, 1965 and 1966) and six national championships (1961–1964, 1966 and 1967); he set six world records (five in the clean & jerk, and one in the total) and 20 national records. He was awarded the Order of the Badge of Honour in 1964. He retired from sport in 1970 to work as a miner and weightlifting coach. In his later years he got again addicted to alcohol, which led to a tragic death in a brawl in 1993. Since 1994, a weightlifting tournament is held in his honor in Shakhty, the city where he lived his last years.

References

1935 births
1993 deaths
Russian male weightlifters
Soviet male weightlifters
Olympic weightlifters of the Soviet Union
Weightlifters at the 1964 Summer Olympics
Olympic gold medalists for the Soviet Union
Olympic medalists in weightlifting
Medalists at the 1964 Summer Olympics
European Weightlifting Championships medalists
World Weightlifting Championships medalists
Sportspeople from Kemerovo Oblast